Grüze is a quarter in the district 2 of Winterthur, Switzerland.

It was a part of Oberwinterthur municipality, which was incorporated into Winterthur in 1922.

Transport 
Winterthur Grüze railway station is a stop of the S-Bahn Zürich on the lines S12, S11, S26 and S35. 

Winterthur